Erich Natusch (23 February 1912 – 11 March 1999) was a German sailor. He competed for Germany at the 1952 Summer Olympics and won a bronze medal in the Dragon Class with Theodor Thomsen and Georg Nowka. He also competed for the United Team of Germany at the 1956 Summer Olympics.

References
 

1912 births
1999 deaths
German male sailors (sport)
Olympic sailors of Germany
Olympic sailors of the United Team of Germany
Olympic bronze medalists for Germany
Olympic medalists in sailing
Medalists at the 1952 Summer Olympics
Sailors at the 1952 Summer Olympics – Dragon
Sailors at the 1956 Summer Olympics – Dragon